Saltore (also spelled Saltor) is a census town and a gram panchayat in the Neturia CD block in the Raghunathpur subdivision of the Purulia district in the state of West Bengal, India.

Geography

Location

As per the map of Neturia CD block on page 309 of District Census Handbook, Puruliya. Saltore, Hijuli and Parbelia form a cluster of census towns.

Area overview
Purulia district forms the lowest step of the Chota Nagpur Plateau. The general scenario is undulating land with scattered hills. Raghunathpur subdivision occupies the northern part of the district. 83.80% of the population of the subdivision  lives in rural areas. However, there are pockets of urbanization and 16.20% of the population lives in urban areas. There are 14 census towns in the subdivision. It is presented in the map given alongside. There is a coal mining area around Parbelia and two thermal power plants are there – the 500 MW Santaldih Thermal Power Station and the 1200 MW Raghunathpur Thermal Power Station. The subdivision has a rich heritage of old temples, some of them belonging to the 11th century or earlier. The Banda Deul is a monument of national importance. The comparatively more recent in historical terms, Panchkot Raj has interesting and intriguing remains in the area.

Note: The map alongside presents some of the notable locations in the subdivision. All places marked in the map are linked in the larger full screen map.

Demographics
According to the 2011 Census of India, Saltor had a total population of 5,094, of which 2,543 (50%) were males and 2,551 (50%) were females. There were 668 persons in the age range of 0–6 years. The total number of literate persons in Saltor was 2,961 (66.90% of the population over 6 years).

Infrastructure
According to the District Census Handbook 2011, Puruliya, Saltor covered an area of 4.4111 km2. There is a railway station at Asansol, 15 km away. Among the civic amenities, the protected water supply involved hand pumps. It had 343 domestic electric connections. Among the medical facilities it had 4 medicine shops. Among the educational facilities it had were 1 primary school, 1 middle school, 1 secondary school, the nearest senior secondary school at Parbelia 2 km away, the nearest general degree college at Sarbari 5 km away.

Economy

Coal
There are presently (2020) two collieries under Sodepur Area of Eastern Coalfields Ltd., in Neturia CD block: Parbelia and Dubeswari. Saltore colliery functioned for many years from the days of Bird & Co.

Education
Panchakot Mahavidyalaya was established in 2001 at Sarbari.

Saltore Colliery High School is a Bengali-medium coeducational institution established in 1947. It has facilities for teaching from class V to class X.

Saltore Colliery Hindi High School is a Hindi-medium coeducational institution established in 1974. It has facilities for teaching from class Vi to class XII.

References

Cities and towns in Purulia district